Death on the Riviera is a 1952 detective novel by the British writer John Bude.  It was part of a series featuring Superintendent Meredith of Scotland Yard. While Bude set many of his earlier novels in regional England, after the Second World War they made increasing use of more exotic, Continental settings. In 2016 it was reissued by the British Library Publishing as part of a group of republished crime novels from the Golden Age of Detective Fiction.

Synopsis
On the trail of a gang of counterfeiters headed by London criminal Chalky Cabot, Meredith heads down to the French Riviera after a tip-off from the local police. Joining forces with a local Inspector, they investigate along the coastline until their attention is drawn to the Villa Paloma owned by an eccentrical Englishwoman. Matters are complicated further when a dead body is discovered.

References

Bibliography
 Hubin, Allen J. Crime Fiction, 1749-1980: A Comprehensive Bibliography. Garland Publishing, 1984.
 Reilly, John M. Twentieth Century Crime & Mystery Writers. Springer, 2015.

1952 British novels
British mystery novels
Novels by John Bude
Novels set in France 
British detective novels